The second season of The Masked Singer based on the Masked Singer franchise which originated from the South Korean version of the show King of Mask Singer. It premiered on VTM on 14 January 2022 and is hosted by Niels Destadsbader. The season was won by singer Camille Dhont as "Miss Kitty", with singer Loredana finishing second as "Knight", and party chairman Conner Rousseau placing third as "Rabbit".

The second season started successfully. Highlights in this season was the unmasking of Johnny Logan, the first international contestant outside of the Benelux, and the unexpected unmasking of Robots in the fifth episode, one of the favorites of the public. The first duo ever in the Belgian series, Robots, turned out to be reallife partners Lize Feryn & Aster Nzeyimana. Another reallife couple, Tine Embrechts and Guga Baúl participated, not in duo but with the matching characters Flamme Fatale and Ice King, representing the elements fire and ice. The unexpected reveal of politician Conner Rousseau during the final made headlines and started a debate about politicians in entertainment programs. Winner Camille Dhont  was the revelation of the season.

Production
After the success of the first season, a second season was ordered. The show was filmed during the summer of 2021. The security and confidentiality was even stricter since people knew the show this time with high fines, taping of smartphones and very planned exits for the contestants.

Cast

Panelists
Panel members Julie Van den Steen, Jens Dendoncker and Karen Damen from the first season returned. Andy Peelman, Kevin Janssens and Ruth Beeckmans, who participated at the first season as masked singers, joined the panel. Of this group of 6 judges, a few of them would be selected for each episode. In the second season Bart Kaëll, Élodie Ouédraogo, Ann Tuts & Bart Peeters were guest judges.

Contestants 
The first contestants were introduced on 23 December. Robots were the first time a duo participated in the Belgian series. On 29 December all eight original contestants were introduced. At the same time four symbols alluding to four unseen characters were revealed.

Flamme Fatale joined the line-up in the second episode. Scorpion was introduced in the third episode. Two masked singers first appeared during the fourth episode, Rabbit & Ice King.

Episodes

Episode 1 (14 January)

Episode 2 (21 January)
A new contestant "Flame Fatale" enters the competition.

Episode 3 (28 January)
A new contestant "Scorpion" enters the competition.

Episode 4 (4 February)
Two new contestants "Rabbit" and "Ice King" enter the competition.

Episode 5 (11 February)

Episode 6 (18 February)

Episode 7 (25 February)
 Group performance: "I Gotta Feeling" by Black Eyed Peas

Episode 8 (4 March)
 Group performance: "Learning to Fly" by Sheppard

Episode 9 (11 March)
Each contestant performed two songs. Two contestants were saved from elimination by the judges, one contestant was saved by the audience. The remaining contestant was unmasked.

Episode 10 (18 March) - Finale 
 Group performance: "The Best" by Tina Turner
 Robots Performance: "Rewrite The Stars" from The Greatest Showman
After each contestant performed two songs, two of them will be saved by the audience and the third one is unmasked. The remaining two contestants go up against each other in a sing-off. The audience choose the winner, after which both the runner-up and the winner were unmasked.

Ratings
Official ratings are taken from CIM, which includes viewers who watched the programme within 7 days of the original broadcoast.

See also

The Masked Singer franchise

References

External links
 

Masked Singer
2022 Belgian television seasons